The Kingsport Mets were a Minor League Baseball team of the Appalachian League from 1921 to 2020. They were located in Kingsport, Tennessee, and were last named for the team's major league affiliate, the New York Mets. The team played its home games at Hunter Wright Stadium which opened in 1995. The Mets previously played at Dobyns-Bennett High School. In 1983, while Dobyns-Bennett's field was being renovated, the team temporarily moved to Sarasota, Florida, and played in the Gulf Coast League as the Gulf Coast League Mets.

History
The first professional team to hail from Kingsport was the Kingsport Indians who played in the Appalachian League from 1921 to 1925. From 1938 to 1941, the Kingsport team was known as the Cherokees, but changed to the Dodgers in 1942 when the team became a farm team of Major League Baseball's Brooklyn Dodgers. They reverted to the Cherokees name in 1943 and continued to play under this moniker through 1955. The Kingsport Cherokees competed in the Mountain States League from 1953 to 1954, before returning to the Appalachian League in 1957 as the Kingsport Orioles after two years of dormancy. After another two years on hiatus, Kingsport returned as the Pirates from 1960 to 1963. From 1969 to 1970, they competed as the Kingsport Royals. Notable players during this period include Al Cowens and U L Washington.

From 1974 to 1979, they were known as the Braves. As an Atlanta Braves affiliate, multiple future major leaguers played for them, including Matt Sinatro, Rick Behenna, Jose Alvarez, Steve Bedrosian, Paul Runge, Brad Komminsk, Milt Thompson, Brook Jacoby, and Mike Payne. Additionally, National League MVP Dale Murphy and Cy Young Award winner Steve Bedrosian played in Kingsport.

In 1980, the team became known as the Kingsport Mets, the name under which the team has competed since then—with the exception of playing the 1983 season in Sarasota, Florida, as the Gulf Coast League Mets while their home stadium underwent renovations. Players Darryl Strawberry, Dwight Gooden, Kevin Mitchell, José Reyes, David Wright, Lastings Milledge, and A. J. Burnett made their professional debuts in Kingsport. The Mets won the Appalachian League Championship in 1988 and 1995.

The start of the 2020 season was postponed due to the COVID-19 pandemic before ultimately being cancelled on June 30. In conjunction with a contraction of Minor League Baseball beginning with the 2021 season, the Appalachian League was reorganized as a collegiate summer baseball league, and the Mets were replaced by a new franchise in the revamped league designed for rising college freshmen and sophomores.

All Silver Anniversary Team 
In 2005, the team selected 14 former players and a manager for its All Silver Anniversary Team in commemoration of 25 years as a Mets affiliate.

Year-by-year record

Playoffs
1988: Defeated Burlington 2–0 to win league championship.
1995: Defeated Bluefield 2–1 to win league championship.
1996: Lost to Bluefield 2–1 in finals.
2013: Lost to Greeneville 2–1 in semifinals.
2015: Lost to Greeneville 2–1 in semifinals.
2018: Lost to Elizabethton 2–1 in semifinals.

Notable alumni

Baseball Hall of Fame alumni 
 Hoyt Wilhelm (1974, MGR) Inducted, 1985

Notable alumni
 Steve Bedrosian (1978) MLB All-Star; 1987 NL Cy Young Award
 Heath Bell (1998) 3 x MLB All-Star
 Bruce Benedict (1976) 2 x MLB All-Star
 Steve Blass (1960) MLB All-Star
 Dick Bosman (1963) 1969 AL ERA Leader
 A. J. Burnett (1996) MLB All-Star
 Rick Camp (1974)
 Joey Cora (2001, MGR) MLB All-Star
 Al Cowens (1969)
 Jacob deGrom (2010) 3 x MLB All-Star; 2014 NL Rookie of the Year; 2018 and 2019 NL Cy Young
 Steven Matz (2012)
 Mike Difelice (2009-2010, MGR)
 Tim Foli (1998, MGR)
 Dwight Gooden (1982) 4 x MLB All-Star; 1984 NL Rookie of the Year; 1985 NL Cy Young Award
 Carlos Gomez (2004) 2 x MLB All-Star
 Glenn Hubbard (1975-1976) MLB All-Star
 Jason Isringhausen (1992) 2 x MLB All-Star
 Brook Jacoby (1979) 2 x MLB All-Star
 Gregg Jeffries (1985) 2 x MLB All-Star
 Dennis Leonard (1972)
 Jerry May (1961)
Kevin Mitchell (1981) 2 x MLB All-Star; 1989 NL Most Valuable Player
 Dale Murphy (1974) MLB All-Star; 2 x NL Most Valuable Player (1982-1983)
 Daniel Murphy (2006) 3 x MLB All-Star
 Randy Myers (1982) 4 x MLB All-Star
 Angel Pagan (2000)
 Jose Reyes (2000) 3 x MLB All-Star; 2011 NL Batting Title
Josh Satin (2008)
Pete Schourek (1987)
 Darryl Strawberry (1980) 8 x MLB All-Star; 1983 NL Rookie of the Year
 Milt Thompson (1979)
 U.L. Washington (1973)
 Mookie Wilson (2003-2004, MGR)
 Preston Wilson (1993) MLB All-Star
 David Wright (2001-2002) 7 x MLB All-Star

References

External links
Official Kingsport Mets website
Statistics at TheBaseballCube.com
Statistics at Baseball-Reference.com

Defunct Appalachian League teams
Baseball teams established in 1921
Baseball teams disestablished in 2020
Professional baseball teams in Tennessee
Kingsport, Tennessee
New York Mets minor league affiliates
Atlanta Braves minor league affiliates
Kansas City Royals minor league affiliates
Pittsburgh Pirates minor league affiliates
New York Giants minor league affiliates
Baltimore Orioles minor league affiliates
Brooklyn Dodgers minor league affiliates
Washington Senators minor league affiliates
Chicago White Sox minor league affiliates
Former Mountain States League (1948–1954) teams
1921 establishments in Tennessee
2020 disestablishments in Tennessee